Morning Star is the alias of Schuyler Belial, a fictional Marvel Comics villain who was an enemy of Moon Knight and the Werewolf by Night. He first appeared in Moon Knight #29. He was created by Doug Moench and Bill Sienkiewicz.

Fictional character biography
Morning Star was the leader of a group of Satanists known as the Followers of the Left Hand Path. He and his cult spent a year tracking Jack Russell, the increasingly feral Werewolf by Night, the blood of whom Belial thought could be used to "reinvigorate" his followers by turning them into werewolves. In Los Angeles, the cult captured the werewolf, who escaped shortly thereafter, but not before the cult had implanted a tracking device in the creature's skull.

The Werewolf by Night fled to New York City, where the superhero Moon Knight attempted to aid him. They were both later captured by Morning Star and his cult, and taken to Morning Star's offices in the penthouse of New York City's Tishman Building, at 666 Fifth Avenue.

Morning Star planned to use Moon Knight as a human sacrifice, and afterwards to have his followers drink the blood of the Werewolf by Night to give them "the power of the Beast".  However, Moon Knight escaped his captors and helped the Werewolf by Night escape as well.  Morning Star immediately sent his men to recapture the two, but the cultists were defeated. Moon Knight and the Werewolf by Night later infiltrated the cult, returning to Morning Star's offices, where they engaged in battle to defeat the rest of the members.  During this melee, the Werewolf by Night threw Morning Star from the roof of the 41-story Tishman Building, killing him.

References

External links
Morning Star at the Appendix to the Official Handbook of the Marvel Universe

Comics characters introduced in 1983
Marvel Comics supervillains
Fictional Satanists
Characters created by Bill Sienkiewicz
Characters created by Doug Moench